Fort Garry, also known as Upper Fort Garry, was a Hudson's Bay Company trading post at the confluence of the Red and Assiniboine rivers in what is now downtown Winnipeg. 

Fort Garry was established in 1822, although its first iteration was destroyed in 1826 by severe flooding. The trading post was rebuilt in 1836 and served as the administrative centre for the Red River Colony. From 1869 to 1870, the fort was briefly occupied by Louis Riel and his Métis followers during the Red River Rebellion. The fort was demolished in the 1880s to make way for Winnipeg's Main Street, although the fort's gate remains. 

The site of the former fort was designated as a part of a larger National Historic Site in 1924. Development of a provincial heritage site on the historic site of Fort Garry began in the early 21st century.

History
Fort Garry was established by the Hudson's Bay Company (HBC) in 1822 on or near the site of the North West Company's Fort Gibraltar established by John Wills in 1810 and destroyed by Governor Semple's men in 1816 during the Pemmican War. Fort Garry was named after Nicholas Garry, deputy governor of the Hudson's Bay Company. It served as the centre of the fur trade within the Red River Colony. In 1826, a severe flood destroyed the fort. 

The fort was rebuilt in 1836 by HBC to help facilitate the administrative and supply needs for the Red River Colony. The new fort was named Upper Fort Garry to differentiate it from "the Lower Fort," or Lower Fort Garry,  downriver, which was established in 1831. Throughout the mid-to-late 19th century, Upper Fort Garry played a minor role in the actual trading of furs but was central to the administration of the HBC and the surrounding settlement. The Council of Assiniboia, the administrative and judicial body of the Red River Colony mainly run by Hudson's Bay Company officials, met at Upper Fort Garry.

In 1869, the Hudson's Bay Company agreed to surrender its monopoly in the North-West, including Upper Fort Garry. In late 1869 and early 1870, the fort was seized by Louis Riel and his Métis followers during the Red River Rebellion. After the Rebellion, the area around the fort continued to grow. In 1873, the city of Winnipeg was established and the name Fort Garry was no longer used. In 1881-1884 the majority of the fort was demolished to straighten Main Street (it was at Main Street and Assiniboine Avenue).

Legacy
Fort Garry, along with the sites of nearby Forts Rouge and Gibraltar, were collectively designated a National Historic Site in 1924, under the name "Forts Rouge, Garry, and Gibraltar National Historic Site".  Together, the three sites are illustrative of the evolution of the fur trade in Western Canada, from exploration and expansion westward (Fort Rouge, established in 1738 by the French), to the dominance of the North West Company (Fort Gibraltar, established in 1807) and finally the ascendancy of the Hudson's Bay Company (Fort Garry).  The gate at Fort Garry constitutes the only above-ground remains of this succession of forts.

On 15 June 1938 Canada Post issued 'Fort Garry Gate, Winnipeg', a 20¢ stamp.

Although only the fort's main gate remains today, the name "Fort Garry" lives on through various institutions and businesses. An area or division of Winnipeg running along the Red River south of the original fort is called Fort Garry.  The hotel beside the fort is called the Fort Garry Hotel, which was originally constructed for the Grand Trunk Pacific Railway company. Fort Street and Garry Street are on either side of the hotel. Many companies, such as Fort Garry Industries and the Fort Garry Brewing Company, have adopted the name. The Fort Garry Horse has been a component of the Winnipeg military garrison throughout the 20th and into the 21st centuries.

Provincial Heritage Park 
Work has begun on a project to establish a heritage park in the area surrounding what remains of Upper Fort Garry. In the spring of 2010, a bill passed the House in the Manitoba Legislature, entitled The Upper Fort Garry Heritage Provincial Park Act.

In 2007, a development company, Crystal Developers, sought to build an apartment complex next to the fort's original "footprint". However, the Friends of Upper Fort Garry, a group dedicated to developing a historical interpretive park at the site, was convened to oppose them. The plan called for an interpretive centre just outside the old fort's walls, and a large surface parking lot that would have been placed closer to the walls than the apartment itself. After a City of Winnipeg-imposed deadline to raise funds to build a park on the site was nearing, Crystal Developers decided to grant the Friends an additional two years to finish raising the needed funds. Crystal ultimately bowed out of its proposed development plans. Two years later the City of Winnipeg approved the construction by Crystal Developers of a 25-storey apartment tower just west of the original location, on Assiniboine Ave.

The Friends raised enough funds to purchase the buildings already on the site of their proposed heritage park, including a Petro-Canada gas station. The only building that was allowed to stay untouched was the current home of the Manitoba Club, which started as an organization in 1874, only one year after the incorporation of Winnipeg. The existing Manitoba Club building was completed in 1905. The historic Fort Garry Hotel across the street was built shortly thereafter, in 1913.

The plans for the future heritage park at the site of Upper Fort Garry were officially unveiled in May 2010.

From the Hansard Records of the Legislative Assembly of Manitoba, dated Monday, June 14, 2010, it is clear that the boundaries of the proposed Upper Fort Garry Provincial Heritage Park, described in Bill 27–The Upper Fort Garry Heritage Provincial Park Act then under consideration, would not include the Manitoba Club building. In the meeting referenced above, Mr. Jerry Gray (Friends of Upper Fort Garry), referring to the future park boundaries, states that the property is "bordered by Main Street on the east side, Assiniboine on the south side and Fort Street on the west side and then goes up to the back where the gate property is." Evidently, the Manitoba Club property on Broadway is excluded from the proposed heritage park, aside from being located on the same city block. According to the records of the Thirty-Ninth Legislature, Bill 27 received Royal Assent on June 17, 2010, by Proclamation of the Lieutenant-Governor Philip S. Lee.

The park opened to the public on August 6, 2015, with development still to come.

See also
 Coat of arms of Winnipeg
 Council of Keewatin
 Fort Rouge (fortification)
 History of Winnipeg
 Temporary North-West Council
 Spokane Garry (was taught here)

Notes

References

Further reading

 Garry, Nicholas. Diary of Nicholas Garry, Deputy-Governor of the Hudson's Bay Company from 1822-1835. A Detailed Narrative of His Travels in the Northwest Territories of British North America in 1821. 1900.

External links

 Friends of Upper Fort Garry
 The Upper Fort Garry Heritage Provincial Park Act

History of Winnipeg
Garry
Hudson's Bay Company forts